Below is a list of international presidential trips made by Armen Sarkissian as the 4th President of Armenia.

List

External links
 Foreign visits of the President – by the Office to the President of Armenia

References

Sarkissian
Sarkissian
Armenia, Sarkissian
Sarkissian
Diplomatic visits by heads of state
2019 in international relations
2020 in international relations
2021 in international relations